Hammered is the third novel in Kevin Hearne's urban fantasy series, The Iron Druid Chronicles and is the sequel to Hexed. It was released on July 5, 2011.

Plot introduction
Atticus O'Sullivan, last of the Druids, has lived for over 2,100 years, mostly by avoiding trouble. Though it appears that recently trouble has found him frequently. After dispatching a Celtic God fixated on vengeance, and preventing warring witch covens from devastating his hometown of Tempe, Arizona, Atticus hoped that he could focus on training his new initiate, the first in centuries. Instead, an old promise made to a friend leads him to band together with a werewolf, a vampire, an ancient Slavic thunder god, a Chinese Immortal, and a Finnish deity on a frantic mission to the land of Asgard. Their goal - to kill Thor.

Characters
 Atticus O'Sullivan: The last of the Druids.
 Oberon: Irish Wolfhound; he can communicate telepathically with Atticus.
 Gunnar Magnusson: Lawyer, and leader of the Tempe pack who is also a werewolf.
 Leif Helgarson:  Atticus' nighttime lawyer who is also a vampire.
 Perun: Slavic God of Thunder.
 Väinämöinen: Shamanic hero of the ancient culture of Finns.
 Zhang Guo Lao:' One of China's Eight Immortals.
 Thor: Norse God of Thunder.
 Odin: The All-father, father of Thor.
 Granuaile: Atticus' Druid initiate.
 Jesus: Savior of Christianity.
 The Morrigan: Celtic Chooser of the Slain and goddess of war.
 Widow MacDonagh: Atticus’ neighbor and friend.
 Hallbjörn “Hal” Hauk: Atticus’ daytime lawyer who is also a werewolf.
 Malina Sokolowski: Leader of the Sisters of the Three Auroras Coven of Witches .
 Laksha Kulasekaran: Indian witch that possesses the bodies of others.

Reception
In their review of Hammered, SFFWorld said that "Hearne and Atticus could be the logical heir to Butcher and Dresden."

References 

Urban fantasy novels
2011 American novels
Del Rey books